was Mayor of Hiroshima from May to July 1909.

Mayors of Hiroshima
1856 births
1909 deaths